The 1908–09 Lancashire Cup was the fourth year for this regional rugby league competition and saw a final between two previous cup winners. The cup was won by Wigan who beat Oldham in the final at Wheater's Field, Broughton, Salford,  by a score of 10–9. The attendance for the final was 20,000 and receipts £600.

First round 
With 12 clubs in the competition, the first round was arranged to draw eight teams in four fixtures with the remaining four teams receiving a bye to the second round. The draw was made in July 1908 and resulted in Barrow, Leigh, Rochdale Hornets and Swinton having a bye. The four ties were all played on 7 November 1908.

A replay for the Broughton Rangers and Runcorn fixture was played on Monday 9 November at Broughton's Wheater's Field and ended in an 8-all draw.  A second replay was arranged for Wednesday 11 November at a neutral venue, Oldham's Watersheddings. Runcorn won this second replay 10–7.

Second round 
The draw for the second round was made on 10 November with the ties played on 21 November 1908.

The replay between Wigan and Leigh was arranged for 23 November 1908 at Wigan's Central Park. Wigan won the match 11–5 but after the game, Leigh lodged a complaint with the Northern Union that during the game, a Wigan player had left the pitch without the referee's consent in breach of the rules of the game.  The Lancashire committee considered the complaint the following day and agreed that Wigan had breached the rules. The result was therefore voided and the tie ordered to be replayed the following Monday, 30 November. The replayed tie was won 17–3 by Wigan.

Semi-finals 
The draw was made on 25 November, at the same meeting which considered the Wigan v Leigh incident.  The ties were played on 5 December 1908.

Final 
The final was played at Wheater's Field on 19 December 1908. Wigan beat Oldham 10–9.  The attendance of almost 21,000 was a record for the competition and the official receipts totalled £600/4/9.

See also 
1908–09 Northern Rugby Football Union season
Rugby league county cups

References

 

RFL Lancashire Cup
Lancashire Cup